The 1958 Sun Bowl was a college football bowl game played between Drake Bulldogs and Louisville Cardinals at Kidd Field in El Paso, Texas.

Background
This was Louisville's first ever bowl appearance. This was Drake's first bowl game since 1949.

Scoring summary
Ken Porco carried the ball 20 times for 119 yards and one touchdown in an MVP effort, after Lenny Lyles (their lead rusher of the season) was injured on the first play.

First Quarter
Drake - Labrasea 2-yard touchdown run (Leeman kick) (7–0 Drake)
Louisville - Cain 4-yard touchdown run (Young kick) (Tied 7–7)

Second Quarter
Drake - Labrasea 17 yard touchdown run (Leeman kick) (14–7 Drake)
Louisville -  Ed Young 37 yard touchdown pass from Dale Orem (Young kick) (Tied 14–14)
Louisville - Pete Bryant 4 yard touchdown run (Young kick) (21–14 Louisville)

Third Quarter
Louisville - Porco 2-yard touchdown run (Young kick) (28–14 Louisville)

Fourth Quarter
Drake - Kinzel 55-yard touchdown pass from Roger La Brasca (kick failed) (28–20 Louisville)
Louisville - Young 20 yard touchdown pass from Pete Bryant (kick failed) (34–20 Louisville)

Statistics

References

Sun Bowl
Sun Bowl
Drake Bulldogs football bowl games
Louisville Cardinals football bowl games
1958 in sports in Texas
Sun